Ennio Foppiani (born 13 May 1959) is an Italian writer, psychiatrist and psychotherapist and co-founder and editor of the Radure ("Clearings") series of magazines, published in Italy by Moretti & Vitali.

Foppiani is also the author of several publications and essays.

Selected works
with Enrico Borla, Losfeld, la terra del dio che danza, Bergamo: Moretti & Vitali, 2005 
with Enrico Borla, Bricolage per un naufragio, Alla deriva nella notte del mondo, Bergamo: Moretti & Vitali, 2009

See also
 Enrico Borla
 Carl Gustav Jung
 Alfred Adler

References

Psychodynamics
Psychology writers
1959 births
Living people